Culex (Lophoceraomyia) uniformis is a species of mosquito belonging to the genus Culex. It is found in India, Malaysia, Hainan Island, New Guinea, Philippines and Sri Lanka. A sup-species Culex (Lophoceraomyia) uniformis ssp. mercedesae is named after the Filipino acarologist Mercedes Delfinado.

References 

uniformis
Insects described in 1905